The Yale Program for the Study of Antisemitism (YPSA) is an interdisciplinary center at Yale University in New Haven, CT devoted to the study of both historical and contemporary forms of antisemitism.  Housed at the Whitney Humanities Center, YPSA sponsors lectures and conferences, produces videos, and provides research grants to Yale faculty and students.  It was founded amid controversy in 2011, following the decision by the Yale administration to shut down YIISA, the Yale Initiative for the Interdisciplinary Study of Antisemitism.  The current director of YPSA is Maurice Samuels, Betty Jane Anlyan Professor of French at Yale University.

History

In June 2011, after a review by a faculty committee, then Provost of Yale University (now President), Peter Salovey, announced the closing of the Yale Initiative for the Interdisciplinary Study of Antisemitism. Salovey cited insufficient scholarly activity as the main reason for the closing of the center. After an outcry in certain segments of the Jewish community and the press over the closing, a small group of Yale faculty met with Salovey and then-President Richard Levin to ask that a new center be created. On June 19, 2011, the university announced the creation of the Yale Program for the Study of Antisemitism, with Maurice Samuels as the inaugural director. Samuels is a specialist in the history of Jews in France. In a statement on June 21, 2011, Samuels announced that the new program would focus on both historical and contemporary forms of antisemitism: “Like many, I am concerned by the recent upsurge in violence against Jews around the world and YPSA will address these concerns,” Samuels wrote. “I also believe that we benefit a great deal by placing current events into historical context. YPSA will not refrain from exploring any controversial contemporary topic.”

Activities

Since its founding in 2011, YPSA has organized conferences on a number of topics relating to both contemporary and historical forms of antisemitism, such as: “Antisemitism in France:  Past, Present, Future” (2012);“Exodus or Exile:  The Departure of Jews from Muslim Countries, 1948-1978” (2013); and “Troubling Legacies:  Antisemitism in Antiquity and its Aftermath” (2014).  It also runs the Benjamin and Barbara Zucker Lecture Series, which has featured a number of talks on recent cases of Islamist terrorist attacks on Jews in Europe and elsewhere.

YPSA administers the Salo W. and Jeannette M. Baron Research grants for Yale faculty and students studying antisemitism, named in honor of the Jewish historian Salo Wittmayer Baron (1895–1989) and his wife. YPSA has produced a video featuring University of Illinois professor Cary Nelson discussing the “Ten Worst Things about BDS,” opposing the Boycott, Divestment, and Sanctions movement. YPSA also houses the Yale Archive for Iranian Jewish Testimonies, founded in 2014 by the journalist Roya Hakakian.

References

External links
Yale Program for the Study of Antisemitism Official Website ypsa.yale.edu. Retrieved 12 April 2016.

Yale University
Centers for the study of antisemitism
Research institutes established in 2011
2011 establishments in Connecticut